The Federation of Financial and Administrative Services (COMFIA) was a trade union representing white collar workers in Spain.

The union was founded in 1997, when the Federation of Banking and Savings merged with the National Federation of Insurance.  Like both its predecessors, it affiliated to the Workers' Commissions.  In 2014, it merged with the National Federation of Trade, Hotels and Tourism, to form the Federation of Services

References

Clerical trade unions
Finance sector trade unions
Trade unions established in 1997
Trade unions disestablished in 2014
Trade unions in Spain